USSS Electronic Countermeasures Suburban is the United States Secret Service Electronic Counter Measures Chevrolet Suburban, an element of a United States presidential motorcade or vice-presidential motorcade.

This vehicle is usually in front of the Presidential Sparecoach and usually trails the vice-presidential limo behind the Vice Presidential Follow-Up Vehicle and is used to counter guided attacks, such as IEDs, rocket-propelled grenades, and anti-tank guided missiles.  Its most identifying mark are two collinear antennas mounted on the roof that are solely used in barrage jamming applications, the primary method used to counter IED threats.  The antenna configuration can be changed according to threat level, for instance, taller antennas are used to increase the jamming protection distance, or change jamming frequency ranges.  The vehicles were modified by Advanced Counter Measure Systems, Inc, a division of Sierra Nevada Corporation.

The secondary distinguishing mark are two dome-shaped electronic warfare (EW) sensors. The EW sensors are most likely millimeter-wave radars used to detect the launch of a rocket-propelled grenade (RPG) or laser range finder illumination and launch of an anti-tank guided missile (ATGM).

Upon detection of a launch, or a laser range finder illumination,  the system mostly likely triggers a salvo of infrared smoke grenades launched from this vehicle and the presidential limo to provide both a visual smoke screen in the kill zone and to also act as an obscurant for IR and radar guided attacks. This can be assumed, since it is known that the presidential limo is equipped with a driver's vision enhancer system which gives the driver the ability to drive in an infrared smoke environment.  The visual obscurants would give the secure package the ability to leave the kill zone, leaving the counter-assault team (CAT) to deal with the threat.

External links
Sierra Nevada Remote Frisk Concealed Object Detection
Shadowbolt IV Jammer Specifications
Electronic Warfare Suburban
Police Agencies Seek Permission to Jam Cell Phone Signals
SSC San Diego TD 3105, September 2000
Barrage Jamming Antenna

Executive Office of the President of the United States
Electronic countermeasures